Harold Lomax Ousley (January 23, 1929 – August 13, 2015) was an American jazz tenor saxophonist and flautist.

Background 
Born in Chicago, Ousley began playing in the late-1940s and 1950s. He accompanied Billie Holiday and recorded with Dinah Washington. He played as a sideman with Gene Ammons in the 1950s and with Jack McDuff and George Benson in the 1960s. He released his first record as a leader in 1961. In the 1970s, he played with Lionel Hampton and Count Basie in addition to releasing further material as a leader. After 1977, he did not release another album under his own name until Grit-Grittin' Feelin''' (2000). Ousley died on August 13, 2015, in Brooklyn.

Discography
As leader
 Tenor Sax (Bethlehem, 1961)
 The Kid! (Cobblestone, 1972)
 The People's Groove (Muse, 1977)
 Sweet Double Hipness (Muse, 1980)
 That's When We Thought of Love (J's Way Records, 1986)
 Grit-Grittin' Feelin (Delmark, 2000)

As sidemanWith Jack McDuff' Walk On By (Prestige, 1966)
 Hallelujah Time! (Prestige, 1963–1966 [1967])
 Soul Circle (Prestige, 1964–1966 [1968])
 I Got a Woman (Prestige, 1964–1966 [1969])
 Steppin' Out'' (Prestige, 1961–1966 [1969])

References

External links
Harold Ousley at Artistdirect.com
The Kid album review at Soul-sides.com

1929 births
2015 deaths
Musicians from Chicago
American jazz tenor saxophonists
American male saxophonists
American jazz flautists
Jazz-blues saxophonists
Bebop saxophonists
Hard bop saxophonists
Latin jazz saxophonists
Soul-jazz saxophonists
Swing saxophonists
Muse Records artists
Cobblestone Records artists
Jazz musicians from Illinois
American male jazz musicians
20th-century American saxophonists
20th-century flautists